Jerry Bradley (born August 6, 1945) is an American-born Canadian football player who played professionally for the Toronto Argonauts and BC Lions.

References

1945 births
Living people
BC Lions players
Players of Canadian football from San Francisco
California Golden Bears football players